Anargyros Printezis (9 September 1937 – 18 March 2012), was the titular bishop of Gratianopolis and Apostolic Exarch of the Byzantine Rite Catholics in Greece. He was appointed titular bishop of Gratianopolis and Apostolic Exarch of the Byzantine Rite Catholics in Greece on 28 June 1975 and ordained bishop on 6 August 1975. Anargyros retired from Apostolic Exarchate of the Byzantine Rite Catholics in Greece on 23 April 2008.

References

Sources 
http://www.catholic-hierarchy.org/bishop/bprina.html
http://www.gcatholic.org/dioceses/diocese/gree3.htm
https://web.archive.org/web/20110710175103/http://elcathex.com/eke/index.php?option=content&task=view&id=172&Itemid=
https://web.archive.org/web/20080630053909/http://www.elcathex.com/eke/index.php?option=content&task=view&id=1037&Itemid=
https://web.archive.org/web/20110727224855/http://www.rumkatkilise.org/community_news_page.htm

External links 
Catholic-Hierarchy

1937 births
2012 deaths
People from Poseidonia
Greek Eastern Catholic bishops
20th-century Eastern Catholic bishops
21st-century Eastern Catholic bishops